Balandino is the name of several rural localities in Russia:

Balandino, Perm Krai, a village in Lobanovskoye Rural Settlement, Permsky District, Perm Krai
Balandino, Vladimir Oblast, a village in Fominskoye Rural Settlement, Gorokhovetsky District, Vladimir Oblast